Vicki Barr may refer to:

 Vicki Barr (athlete) (born 1982), British sprinter
 The lead character in the Vicki Barr (books) series